Jędrzejewski (feminine Jędrzejewska) is a Polish surname. Notable people include:

 Aleksander Jędrzejewski, Polish painter
 Dominik Jędrzejewski, Polish Roman Catholic priest
 Marcin Jędrzejewski, Polish speedway rider
 Sidonia Jędrzejewska, Polish politician
 Władysław Jędrzejewski, Polish general
 Władysław Jędrzejewski (boxer), Polish boxer

Polish-language surnames